Cable is an unincorporated community in Haven Township, Sherburne County, Minnesota, United States. The community is between Clear Lake and St. Cloud along U.S. Highway 10 near Sherburne County Road 65, 42nd Street SE.

Sherburne County Roads 3 and 7 and the St. Cloud Regional Airport are nearby.

Cable had a post office from 1884 to 1892; Violetta Cable was its first postmaster.

References

Unincorporated communities in Minnesota
Unincorporated communities in Sherburne County, Minnesota